The 2008 1000 km of Catalunya was the opening round of the 2008 Le Mans Series season.  It took place at the Circuit de Catalunya, Spain, on 6 April 2008.

Race results
Class winners in bold.  Cars failing to complete 70% of winner's distance marked as Not Classified (NC).

Statistics
 Pole Position - #8 Team Peugeot Total - 1:31.875
 Fastest Lap - #8 Team Peugeot Total - 1:33.515
 Average Speed - 167.030 km/h

References

External links
 Le Mans Series – 1000 km de Catalunya

Catalunya
Catalunya